Highgate United F.C. is a Jamaican football team playing in the second tier of Jamaican football.

It is based in Highgate, St Mary's, but plays in Jamaica National Premier League home games in Buff Bay, Portland.

History

Recent seasons
Highgate clinched promotion to the top level in June 2011 under guidance of Calvin Lewis. Lewis was then lured to Portmore United prompting Highgate to line-up Braxton Hyre as interim before Michael Beckford took over. They entered the Premier League recruiting seven players from relegated St George's and three from relegated Benfica.

Highgate were themselves relegated after the 2012/13 season.

Achievements
Promoted to Premier League 2011
Eastern Confederation Super League Champion

Head coaches
  Calvin Lewis
  Michael Beckford

References

External links

Football clubs in Jamaica